The European Asylum Curriculum (EAC) is for the moment the biggest practical cooperation EU project in the field of asylum and is an important tool to reach a more harmonized asylum procedure within Europe.

The EAC is an EU Member State initiative intending to enhance the capacity and quality of the European asylum process as well as to strengthen practical cooperation among the European asylum/immigration systems. With the motto "Knowledge and skills for protection in Europe" the cooperation between the Odysseus Academic Network and several EU member states' Immigration Services creates a European Asylum Curriculum, which provides common vocational training for employees of the Immigration and Asylum Services in Europe.

See also
Asylum in the European Union

Immigration to Europe
Right of asylum in the European Union